Gebar is an uninhabited island in the Torres Strait in the Australian state of Queensland.

The first recorded sighting by Europeans was by the Spanish expedition of Luís Vaez de Torres on 10 September 1606. It was recorded again by Bligh on 11 September 1792 as 'an island with two hills' and given the name The Brothers. Subsequently, it has been known as Brothers Hills or Two Brothers, while the anglicisation 'Gabba' is frequently seen on historical maps.

The traditional owners of Gebar are the Gebaralgal who today reside on Yam Island,  to the southeast. On 13 December 2004, their native title claim over Gebar was determined in the Federal Court of Australia. In a deposition to the court, Mr Dick Peters, a member of the claim group, said: 'I confirm that ... Gebaralgal have always enjoyed, and continue to enjoy, their rights to use, occupy and live on their land and to exclude
others from it and to use and enjoy the natural resources of the land such as animal and plant life. For example, my family
and I frequently visit Gebar to hunt for turtle, collect turtle eggs, fish from the beach and collect plant materials for food and other purposes'.

The Newton, a  ketch, foundered off Gabba Island in December 1913.

References

Torres Strait Islands
Uninhabited islands of Australia